Jonathan Mark Krause (born 12 March 1981) is an Australian Liberal National Party politician who is the member of the Legislative Assembly of Queensland for Scenic Rim. He was first elected in 2012 as the member for Beaudesert, which was renamed in 2017.

Early life
Krause was born on 12 March 1981 in Ipswich and grew up on a dairy farm at Marburg. He attended school in Marburg and Ipswich. Krause graduated from Ipswich Grammar School in 1998. He completed law and accounting studies at the University of Queensland.

References

1981 births
Living people
Members of the Queensland Legislative Assembly
Liberal National Party of Queensland politicians
Australian solicitors
University of Queensland alumni
21st-century Australian politicians